Chris Reason (born 1 October 1965) is a senior reporter and presenter for Seven News in Sydney, Australia. He was awarded the Graham Perkin Australian Journalist of the Year Award for his coverage of the Lindt Cafe siege in December 2014.

Career
Reason's career began in 1990, when during his first year at Seven News he unwittingly covered a segment now infamously known as the Democracy Manifest video, which became an Internet viral video years later. In 2019, The Guardian called it "perhaps the pre-eminent Australian meme of the past 10 years".

In 2002, he was announced as co-host of the re-launched national breakfast program Sunrise alongside Melissa Doyle. But in September, Reason was diagnosed with cancer and forced to retire from the program while he underwent six months of chemotherapy, surgery and recovery care. He was replaced by David Koch. The cancer was an abdominal metastasis of the testicular cancer he had fought four years earlier. Reason had missed a critical health check-up in 2001 while covering the September 11 terror attacks in the United States, and he says it almost cost him his life. In multiple interviews since, he has warned young men to never miss a health check-up.

In 2003, after his recovery, Reason had multiple roles—first as presenter of Seven Morning News, and then presenter of Sunday Sunrise in 2004. In 2005, he was named co-host of Weekend Sunrise alongside Lisa Wilkinson, but he was later replaced by Deal or No Deal host Andrew O'Keefe. Reason returned to full-time reporting as Senior Network Correspondent.

In 2015, he won the Graham Perkin Award for his coverage of the Lindt Cafe siege. He has won a Walkley Award and two Logie Awards for News Reporting.

Reason is a back-up presenter for most of the Seven News programs, including Seven Morning News, Seven Afternoon News and Seven News Sydney. He also intermittently fills in for either David Koch or Matt Doran on Sunrise and Weekend Sunrise respectively, and appears on the former show during the week as one of the News Feed panelists.

Personal life
His father died from brain cancer in 2006. He attended Villanova College in the Brisbane suburb of Coorparoo and the University of Queensland (BA). Reason married journalist Kathryn Robinson in 2005. They became parents to twins in 2007.

References

External links
 Seven News website
 https://web.archive.org/web/20091005065545/http://www.claxtonspeakers.com.au/speakers_profile/915

Australian television presenters
Australian television journalists
Living people
People educated at Villanova College (Australia)
People from Brisbane
1965 births